Clathrina macleayi is a species of calcareous sponge from Australia.

References

Sponges described in 1885
Sponges of Australia